August Max-Günther  Schrank (19 November 1898 – 22 September 1960) was a German Generalleutnant who commanded the 5. Gebirgs-Division in World War II. He was also a recipient of the Knight's Cross of the Iron Cross for the Battle of Crete.

Awards
 Iron Cross Second (1918) and First (1919) Classes
 Clasp to the Iron Cross Second (1939) and First (1939) Classes
 Honour Cross of the World War 1914/1918 (1934)
 Knight's Cross of the Iron Cross on 17 July 1941 as Oberstleutnant and commander of the I./Gebirgsjäger-Regiment 100
 Bavarian Military Merit Order 4. Class with Swords (1919)

References

Citations

Bibliography

 
 
 

1898 births
1960 deaths
Lieutenant generals of the German Army (Wehrmacht)
Gebirgsjäger of World War II
Recipients of the Knight's Cross of the Iron Cross
People from the Kingdom of Bavaria
People from Ostallgäu
Military personnel from Bavaria